Konstantinos "Kostas" Charissis (alternate spellings: Constantinos, Costas, Charisis, Harissis, Harisis) (born November 12, 1979) is a Greek professional basketball player. He is a 2.12 m (6 ft 11  in) tall center.

College career
Charissis played NCAA Division I college basketball at USC, with the USC Trojans, from 1999 to 2003.

Professional career
Charissis started playing basketball in 1995, becoming a member of the junior team of Panellinios. In order to get more playing time, he moved to Psychiko, in 1996, where he stayed for two years, competing at the junior and the men's amateur levels. He continued his career by moving to Papagou, during the 1998–99 season, where he made his debut in the top-tier level Greek Basket League. 

In 1999, Charissis moved to Los Angeles, to play NCAA Division I college basketball, at the USC. After playing 4 years of college basketball years with the USC Trojans, (1999–2003), he joined the Greek club Olympiacos Piraeus, for the 2003–04 season. The very next season, he moved to the Greek club Ilysiakos (Greek 2nd Division).

He then spent the next two seasons with Olympias Patras, the first in the Greek 2nd Division, where he won the league's championship, and the second season in the Greek First Division. Then, for the 2007–08 season, he joined AEK Athens, where he stayed only one year. For the next four seasons, he was a part of Kolossos Rodou, from 2008 to 2012. At the age of 33, he decided to move to Aris Thessaloniki in 2012, where he played for three seasons. 

In 2015, he moved to Kos island and joined Ippokratis Kos.

Awards and accomplishments
1999–00
USC Trojans "Best Newcomer" award 
2000–01
Reached the NCAA Division I "Elite" 8
2001–02 
2nd in Pac-10 Conference Tournament
Reached the NCAA Division I Top 64
2002–03
USC Trojans Co-captain
USC Trojans "110% Effort" award
2003–04
Reached Greek Cup Final
2005–06
Greek 2nd Division Champion
1st Blocks Greek 2nd Division
6th Rebounds Greek 2nd Division
7th 2ts % Greek 2nd Division     
2006–07
1st Blocks Greek Basket League
7th Rebounds Greek Basket League
2008–09
Greek Basket League
3rd Blocks 
Greek League All-Star
2009–10
Greek Basket League
2nd Blocks     
2010–11
Greek Basket League
5th Blocks
11th Rebounds<br/ >
Greek League All-Star
2011–12
Greek Basket League
11th Rebounds
11th Blocks 
2012–13
Greek Basket League
11th Rebounds
8th Blocks
2013–14
Greek Basket League
11th Rebounds
10th Blocks

References

External links
Euroleague.net Profile
FIBA Europe Profile
Eurobasket.com Profile
Greek Basket League Profile
Draftexpress.com Profile
USC College Basketball Profile

1979 births
Living people
AEK B.C. players
Aris B.C. players
Centers (basketball)
Greek men's basketball players
Greek expatriate basketball people in the United States
Ilysiakos B.C. players
Kolossos Rodou B.C. players
Olympiacos B.C. players
Olympias Patras B.C. players
Papagou B.C. players
Power forwards (basketball)
Basketball players from Athens
USC Trojans men's basketball players